19th Street LBC Compilation is a compilation presented by Big C Style, introducing Long Beach based rappers, and mostly featuring Tha Dogg Pound and LBC Crew affiliates.

Track listing

Critical reception
The compilation received moderate reviews. AllMusic's Leo Stanley gave it 3/5 stars and says that "it's a good concept, and for the most part, it works well, even if some of the tracks are a little flat musically."

References

1998 compilation albums
Hip hop compilation albums
Albums produced by L.T. Hutton
Virgin Records compilation albums
Albums produced by Daz Dillinger
Albums produced by Soopafly